Erwin Posselt was an ethnic German luger who competed in the early 1910s. He won a gold medal in the men's doubles event at the inaugural European championships of 1914 in Reichenberg, Bohemia (now Liberec, Czech Republic).

References

Bohemian male lugers
Year of birth missing
Year of death missing
German Bohemian people